Wedgetail may refer to:

 Boeing 737 AEW&C, an aircraft nicknamed the Wedgetail
 Acanthagrion, a genus of damselflies commonly called wedgetails
 Wedge-tail triggerfish
 Wedge-tailed eagle

Animal common name disambiguation pages